Charalmbos Avgerinos (Greek: Χαράλαμπος Αυγερινός, 18th century – 19th century) was a Greek politician.  He was the father of Nakis Avgerinos.  He ran for mayor of Pyrgos.  He preceded by Christos Stefanopoulos and was later succeeded by Takis Vakalopoulos.

References
The first version of the article is translated and is based from the article at the Greek Wikipedia (el:Main Page)

Charalambos
People from Pyrgos, Elis
Politicians from Elis
Year of death missing
Year of birth missing